Pierre Quesnel (c. 1502 – c. 1580) was a 16th-century French artist who worked in Scotland.

Pierre worked in Scotland for Mary of Guise and James V. He is listed as an Usher in Guise's household and is identified as the "queen's painter" in the Scottish Treasurer's Accounts. Artists at the French court were sometimes given positions as ushers or valets. Pierre Quesnel, described as "Perys the uscher", was given £10 at the time of Mary of Guise's coronation. According to an inscription on the back of a portrait of his son Nicholas, he married Madeleine Digby in Scotland, and his eldest son the painter François Quesnel was born in Edinburgh.

Other French craftsmen working on the Scottish royal palace include the woodcarver and metal-worker Andrew Mansioun and the mason Nicolas Roy. Pierre Quesnel was mentioned in the household accounts of Mary of Guise after the death of James V, but seems to have returned to France with his family around the year 1544. His sons Nicolas and Jacques Quesnel were also artists, and a number of chalk portraits by François and Nicolas survive. Jacques's work is known only through a single drawing, Time slaying Youth.

Pierre Quesnel's work is also mostly lost, excepting an Architectural Study after Jacques Androuet du Cerceau, preserved at the École nationale supérieure des Beaux-Arts in Paris, and another drawing, a view called Château of Sées. The Abbé de Marolles, a seventeenth-century French writer, recorded Pierre in verse as the designer of a stained-glass window for the Eglise des Augustins in Paris in 1557, with subject, Ascension of Christ with Portraits of Henri II and Catherine de Medici, now destroyed. Marolles also stated that Pierre and his son François designed tapestries. Although these works are destroyed, there is a portrait of Pierre himself made by Nicolas or François in 1574.

The historian Andrea Thomas argued from Pierre's small salary as an usher in Scotland that he was a decorative painter rather a portrait artist. Pierre and François Quesnel were recorded painting panelling and chimneypieces in Paris in 1570.

In November 1541, Mary of Guise's mother, Antoinette de Bourbon, wrote to thank her daughter for what may have been a portrait miniature James V had sent, which she called a "diamond", and could have been painted from life:pour bien faire mes tres humbles mersimens au Roy du dyament quy luy a pleu m'envoyer. Je vous repons se m'a este present bien agreable et que j'ayme aultant qu'yl est possible; il sera garde toute ma vye pour l'onneur de luy. Je l'ay trouve sy beau sa painture que sy savyes combien je l'ayme je peur vous en series jallouse.

And to make my very humble thanks to the King for the "diamond" he sent me. I tell you it is most agreeable and I hold it in highest esteem, it will be kept carefully all my life for his honour. I find his picture so beautiful that if it was known how much, I fear that you would be jealous.

The 2010 paintwork of the restored palace at Stirling Castle was designed and created with the story of Pierre Quesnel in mind.

Footnotes

External links
 
 
 Biography of François Quesnel 
 'Stirling Castle Palace Project: An Artistic Alliance', Historic Environment Scotland.

16th-century French painters
French male painters
French Renaissance painters
Scottish portrait painters
French portrait painters
16th-century Scottish painters
Scottish male painters
Renaissance artists
16th century in Scotland
Year of death unknown
Court of James V of Scotland
Year of birth uncertain
French tapestry artists
Material culture of royal courts
1500s births
1580s deaths